Mitford and Launditch Hundred was an old grouping of parishes for administrative purposes in the County of Norfolk, England.   It is located around East Dereham and is bordered by Walsingham Hundred, Aylsham Hundred, Horsham St. Faith Hundred, Forehoe Hundred, Wayland Hundred, Swaffham Hundred (South Greenhoe Hundred ) and Freebridge Lynn Hundred.

The hundred comprises the following parishes:

Bawdeswell, Beeston All Saints, Beetley, Billingford, Bintree, Bittering, Brisley, Bylaugh
Colkirk, Cranworth
East Bilney, East Dereham, East Lexham, East Tuddenham, Elsing
Foxley
Garveston, Gateley, Great Dunham, Great Fransham, Gressenhall, Guist
Hardingham, Hockering, Hoe, Horningtoft
Kempstone
Letton, Litcham, Little Dunham, Little Fransham, Longham, Lyng
Mattishall, Mattishall Burgh, Mileham
North Elmham
Oxwick with Pattesley
Reymerstone, Rougham
Scarning, Shipdham, Southburgh, Sparham, Stanfield, Swanton Morley
Thuxton, Tittleshall with Godwick, Twyford
Weasenham All Saints, Weasenham St. Peter, Wellingham, Wendling, West Lexham, West Tuddenham, Westfield, Whinburgh, Whissonsett, Wood Rising, Worthing
Yaxham

References

Breckland District
Hundreds of Norfolk